The Saint Francis Red Flash men's basketball team represents Saint Francis University in Loretto, Pennsylvania, United States.  The school's team currently competes in the Northeast Conference. They are currently led by 11th year head coach Rob Krimmel and play their home games at the DeGol Arena.

History
Jim Baron Era (1987–1992)

Baron lead The Red Flash to their first NCAA tournament appearance in 1991, where they lost in the First Round to the Arizona Wildcats 93-80. In 1992 Baron left to coach at his alma mater, Saint Bonaventure.

His record was 74-71.

Postseason results

NCAA tournament results
The Red Flash have appeared in the NCAA Tournament one time. Their record is 0–1.

NIT results
The Red Flash have appeared in the National Invitation Tournament (NIT) four times. Their combined record is 3–5.

CIT results
The Red Flash have appeared in the CollegeInsider.com Postseason Tournament (CIT) three times. Their combined record is 1–3.

NCIT results
The Red Flash have appeared in the National Catholic Invitational Tournament four times. Their combined record is 3–4.

Retired jerseys
Saint Francis has retired three jersey numbers. Uniquely, Stokes' number is the only one that would not be a number under current NCAA rules, as jersey numbers containing a 6, 7, 8, or 9 are prohibited.

See also
Saint Francis Red Flash women's basketball

References

External links
Website